Cathrine Lindahl (born 26 February 1970 in Härnösand as Cathrine Norberg)  is a Swedish curler from Östersund.

Curling career 
Lindahl played second for her sister Anette Norberg's team, until they split up in 2010. They won gold medals at the 2006 Winter Olympics and 2010 Winter Olympics.

Lindahl skipped a team to both the 1989 and 1990 World Junior Curling Championships, winning the silver medal in the latter, losing to Kirsty Addison of Scotland. The following year, she was an alternate for the gold medal Swedish team skipped by Eva Eriksson. In 1991, she played third for her sister at the World Curling Championships where they won bronze. At that year's European Curling Championships she played second for the team, and won bronze. In 1992, the team went to the 1992 Winter Olympics, where the team finished fifth in the demonstration event.

In 1997, Lindahl skipped her own team at the World Championships, but the team finished in 5th place. By 2001, she was back to playing third for her sister, and they won a silver medal at the World Championships. After that, the team would go on to win the next six World Championships. Lindahl moved to the second position at the beginning of 2003. In addition to six European Championships, the team won a bronze at the Worlds in 2003, a gold in 2005 and an Olympic Championship in 2006.

In 1997 she was inducted into the Swedish Curling Hall of Fame.

Teammates 
2006 Torino Olympic Games

Anette Norberg, Skip

Eva Lund, Third

Anna Svärd, Lead

Ulrika Bergman, Alternate

2009 Gangneung World Championships

2010 Vancouver Olympic Games

Anette Norberg, Skip

Eva Lund, Third

Anna Le Moine, Lead

Kajsa Bergström, Alternate

References

External links

1970 births
Living people
Swedish female curlers
Olympic curlers of Sweden
Curlers at the 2006 Winter Olympics
Olympic gold medalists for Sweden
Curlers at the 2010 Winter Olympics
Olympic medalists in curling
Medalists at the 2010 Winter Olympics
Medalists at the 2006 Winter Olympics
Continental Cup of Curling participants
World curling champions
European curling champions
Swedish curling champions
People from Härnösand
Sportspeople from Västernorrland County